Philip Mukomana (born 21 April 1974) is a Zimbabwean sprinter who specialized in the 400 metres. He carried the flag for his native country at the opening ceremony of the 2000 Summer Olympics in Sydney, Australia.

Mukomana finished seventh in 4 x 400 metres relay at the 1997 World Championships, together with teammates Tawanda Chiwira, Savieri Ngidhi and Ken Harnden. The team set a Zimbabwean record of 3:00.79 minutes during the heats. 

On the individual level, Mukomana won a bronze medal at the 1999 All-Africa Games in a personal best time of 45.43 seconds.

External links

1974 births
Living people
Zimbabwean male sprinters
Athletes (track and field) at the 2000 Summer Olympics
Olympic athletes of Zimbabwe
Athletes (track and field) at the 1998 Commonwealth Games
Athletes (track and field) at the 2002 Commonwealth Games
Commonwealth Games competitors for Zimbabwe
World Athletics Championships athletes for Zimbabwe
African Games bronze medalists for Zimbabwe
African Games medalists in athletics (track and field)
Athletes (track and field) at the 1999 All-Africa Games